The 2013–14 Conference USA men's basketball season began with practices in October 2013, followed by the start of the 2013–14 NCAA Division I men's basketball season in November.

Preseason

Preseason polls

C-USA was the only conference not to publish an official preseason poll. However, other publications did publish preseason projections.

Although CBS Sports did not rank all the teams, they selected Louisiana Tech as their projected champion and mentioned Southern Miss and UTEP as contenders.

Preseason Players to Watch

C-USA did not name a preseason all-conference team, but each of the coaches selected a player to watch from their team.

Preconference schedules

Early-season tournament victories

Rankings

Conference schedules

Conference matrix
This table summarizes the head-to-head results between teams in conference play.

Player of the week
Players of the week
Throughout the conference regular season, the C-USA offices named one or two players of the week and one or two freshmen of the week each Monday.

Honors and awards

All-Conference USA Awards and Teams

NABC
The National Association of Basketball Coaches announced their Division I All-District teams on March 12, recognizing the nation's best men's collegiate basketball student-athletes. Selected and voted on by member coaches of the NABC, 252 student-athletes, from 25 districts were chosen. The selections on this list were then eligible for NABC Coaches' All-America Honors. The following list represented the District 11 players chosen to the list.

First Team
Shawn Jones, Middle Tennessee
Chad Frazier, UAB
Pablo Bertone, Florida Atlantic
Julian Washburn, UTEP
Kenneth "Speedy" Smith, Louisiana Tech

Second Team
Neil Watson, Southern Miss
Alex Hamilton, Louisiana Tech
Tymell Murphy, FIU
Vince Hunter, UTEP
James Woodard, Tulsa

Postseason

Conference USA Tournament

  March 11–15, 2014 Conference USA Men's Basketball Tournament, Don Haskins Center, El Paso, Texas.

NCAA tournament

National Invitation Tournament

College Basketball Invitational

CollegeInsider.com Postseason Tournament

References